Aag Ka Darya (River of Fire) is a landmark historical novel written by Qurratulain Hyder providing context to the traumatic partition of the Indian subcontinent into two nation-states. It has been described as "one of the Indian Subcontinent’s best known novels". 
The novel timelines spanned more than two thousand years, starting from the time of Chandargupta Maurya in the fourth century BC to the post-Independence period in India and Pakistan. It was published in Urdu in 1959 and translated by the author into English in 1998 as River of Fire. In 2019, it was reprinted by New Directions Publishing.

Background and plot summary
Set across "four Indian epochs (the classical, the medieval, the colonial, and the modern post-national)", Hyder traces the fates of four souls through time: Gautam, Champa, Kamal, and Cyril. "Gautam (appearing first as a student of mysticism at the Forest University of Shravasti in the fourth century B.C.E.) and Champa (throughout embodying the enigmatic experience of Indian women) begin and end the novel; Muslim Kamal appears mid-way through, as the Muslims did, and loses himself in the Indian landscape; and Cyril, the Englishman, appears later still." Their stories crisscross "over different eras, forming and reforming their relationships in romance and war, in possession and dispossession."

Major themes

Together the characters reflect the oneness of human nature amidst the nationalist and religious upheavals of Indian history, Hyder argues for a culture that is inclusive.

Shortly before Partition, Kamal wonders: “The Indo-Muslim life-style is made up of the Persian-Turki-Mughal and regional Rajput Hindu cultures. So, what is this Indianness which the Muslim League has started questioning? Could there be an alternate India? Why?”.

"For postcolonial scholars, Hyder’s history has long been a purposeful rebuke to the purist Hindutva and Islamist ideologue."

Style
Pankaj Mishra in The New York Review of Books wrote: "(River of Fire) has a magisterial ambition and technical resourcefulness rarely seen before in Urdu fiction. (...) Hyder employs diverse genres – letters, chronicles, parables, journals – to present her melancholy vision of the corrosions of time."

Aamer Hussein described the style thus: "Lyrical and witty, occasionally idiosyncratic, it is always alluring and allusive: Flora Annie Steel and E. M. Forster encounter classical Urdu poets; Eliot and Virginia Woolf meet Faiz Ahmed Faiz".

Reception

Aamer Hussein in The Times Literary Supplement wrote that River of Fire is to Urdu fiction what One Hundred Years of Solitude is to Hispanic literature. In 2009 Wasafiri magazine placed the novel on its list of 25 Most Influential Books published in the previous quarter-century.

In a review for a 2019 reprint by New Directions Publishing, Aditi Sriram wrote in The New York Times that the novel "is as relevant in 2019 as it was when she first wrote it in 1959."

Kamil Ahsan in The Nation wrote:

See also
 Artistic depictions of the partition

References

External links 
 2019 reprint of River of Fire by New Direction Publications
 Review of River of Fire by The Complete
 Book Marks Reviews

Indian historical novels
1959 novels
Urdu-language novels
1959 Indian novels
Partition of India in fiction